Hubert A. McMillan was a Scottish amateur footballer who played in the Scottish League for Queen's Park as an inside right.

Personal life 
Allan served as a lieutenant in the Royal Air Force during the First World War.

Career statistics

References 

Scottish footballers
British Army personnel of World War I
Queen's Park F.C. players
Year of death missing
Scottish Football League players
Place of birth missing
Year of birth missing
Royal Air Force personnel of World War I
Royal Air Force officers
Association football inside forwards